Bungoma Airport is an airport in Kenya.

Location
Bungoma Airport  is located in the town of Bungoma, Bungoma County, in western Kenya, close to the International border with the Republic of Uganda.

The geographic coordinates of this airport are:0° 34' 35.00"N, 34° 33' 5.00"E (Latitude:0.576390; Longitude:34.551390).

Overview
Bungoma Airport is a small airport that serves the town of Bungoma. At the moment, there is no scheduled airline service to Bungoma Airport.

Airlines and destinations
None at the moment.

See also
 Kenya Airports Authority
 Kenya Civil Aviation Authority
 List of airports in Kenya

References

External links
  Location of Bungoma Airport At Google Maps
  Website of Kenya Airports Authority
  Airkenya Flight Routes

Airports in Kenya
Bungoma County